Hennadiy Medvedyev (born 7 February 1975) is a professional Ukrainian football midfielder who plays for Vorskla Poltava in the Ukrainian Premier League. He moved to Vorskla Poltava from Adoms (in Kremenchuk Ukrainian Second League) in January 2001 when Adoms was on the verge to be relegated out of professional ranks.  He is currently the captain of Vorskla Poltava.

External links

 Profile on Football Squads
 

1975 births
Living people
Ukrainian footballers
FC Dynamo-3 Kyiv players
FC CSKA-2 Kyiv players
FC Vorskla Poltava players
FC Vorskla-2 Poltava players
FC Zirka Kropyvnytskyi players
FC Zirka-2 Kirovohrad players
FC Dnipro Cherkasy players
FC Adoms Kremenchuk players
Ukrainian Premier League players
Ukrainian First League players
Ukrainian Second League players
Ukrainian Amateur Football Championship players
Ukrainian football managers
Association football midfielders
Footballers from Kyiv